Olimpiya Kirovo-Chepetsk is an ice hockey team in Kirovo-Chepetsk, Russia.

History
The club was founded in 1954 as Khimik Kirovo-Chepetsk and they took on their present name of Olimpiya Kirovo-Chepetsk in 1964. During Soviet times, they participated in the lower-level leagues.

After the dissolution of the Soviet Union, the club took part in the second-level Russian league, the Vysshaya Liga, in all years from 1992-2007 except 1999, when they played in the second-level league organized by the Russian Ice Hockey Federation.

They have participated in the Russian junior league, since 2010.

The famous Soviet hockey player, two-time Olympic champion Alexander Maltsev, and also one-time Olympic champions Vladimir Myshkin, Andrey Trefilov, began his sports career at this club.

External links
 Official website

Ice hockey teams in Russia